The Memory and Tolerance Museum (Spanish: Museo Memoria y Tolerancia) is a museum in Mexico City, Mexico, established in 2010.

References

External links

 
 

2010 establishments in Mexico
Museums established in 2010
Museums in Mexico City